Millbrook railway station serves the villages of Millbrook and Marston Moretaine in Bedfordshire, England. It is on the Marston Vale Line, between Stewartby and Lidlington. Millbrook is also the principal stop for the Marston Vale Millennium Country Park.

History

First opened in 1846 by the Bedford Railway, the station was originally named "Marston", but changed to "Ampthill (Marston)" in 1850 after the nearby village. The opening of a second and more conveniently-sited Ampthill station by the Midland Railway in 1868 on its Midland Main Line gave rise to confusion which was only resolved in 1877 when the original Ampthill station was renamed "Millbrook for Ampthill". The station is the fourth and final on the Marston Vale Line to be built in a half-timbered Gothic Revival style that had been insisted upon by the 7th Duke of Bedford for stations situated in the vicinity of the Woburn Estate. The two station platforms are east of a level crossing.

The station developed substantial coal traffic, as well as trade in cattle and goods with stables in its goods yard and a wagon repairers. A public house called the Morteyne Arms opened opposite the station. Traffic increased still further with the development of the brick industry in the area; a siding was opened on 7 May 1928 to cater for the trade in bricks, the towers of the Millbrook Brick Company could be seen from the station. The brick traffic peaked in the 1930s, with a second brickworks called "Marston Moretaine" being opened a mile from the station; although it was too far for a siding, bricks were transported by road to the station where they were loaded on to rail wagons.

The station, whose name was changed to "Millbrook" in 1910, was reduced to an unstaffed halt in 1968, having lost its formerly substantial goods facilities four years previously. The station building was restored in the early 1980s and converted into a private residence. In 1999, the low station platforms – the last of their type remaining on the line – were rebuilt to the standard height appropriate to modern trains.

In 2021, a bench in memory of Captain Tom Moore was unveiled on the station platform.

Services
Millbrook station, in common with others on the Marston Vale Line, is covered by the Marston Vale Community rail Partnership, which aims to increase use of the line by involving local people.

The station should not be confused with Millbrook station (Hampshire).

An hourly service operates in each direction on weekdays and Saturdays, with no trains on Sundays. A Saturday service operates on most Bank holidays. Services are operated with Class 230 multiple units.

References

Sources

External links

 Station on navigable 1946 O.S. map.

Grade II listed buildings in Bedfordshire
Railway stations in Bedfordshire
DfT Category F2 stations
Former London and North Western Railway stations
Railway stations in Great Britain opened in 1846
Railway stations served by West Midlands Trains
Ampthill
1846 establishments in England
East West Rail